Norbert Dentressangle was a major European transport, logistics and freight forwarder. It was founded in 1979, initially concentrating on cross channel transport between France and the United Kingdom.

In December 2007, Norbert Dentressangle doubled its size, and significantly strengthened its position in Europe, with the acquisition of Christian Salvesen, and in March 2011, it bought the British company TDG. The company reported proforma revenues of €3.8 billion for 2012.

In July 2014, Norbert Dentressangle announced that it would be acquiring Jacobson Companies, a United States based 3PL, for $750 million. Jacobson Companies was then the third largest 3PL in the world. Norbert Dentressangle operated from five hundred sites in twenty European countries, and - at one time - employed 33,000 people.

On 28 April 2015, the group XPO Logistics announced a $3.56 billion (3.24 billion euros) deal to acquire Norbert Dentressangle, including acquired debt. The acquisition was completed on 8 June 2015, and the Dentressangle brand was phased out from June 2015.

References

Logistics companies of France
Transport operators of the United Kingdom
Logistics companies of the United Kingdom